Devon Island is an island in Canada and the largest uninhabited island (no permanent residents) in the world. It is located in Baffin Bay, Qikiqtaaluk Region, Nunavut, Canada. It is one of the largest members of the Arctic Archipelago, the second-largest of the Queen Elizabeth Islands, Canada's sixth-largest island, and the 27th-largest island in the world. The bedrock is Precambrian gneiss and Paleozoic siltstones and shales. Devon Island contains several small mountain ranges, such as the Treuter Mountains, Haddington Range and the Cunningham Mountains. The notable similarity of its surface to that of Mars has attracted interest from scientists.

History and settlement

Robert Bylot and William Baffin were the first Europeans to sight Devon Island in 1616. William Edward Parry charted its south coast in 1819–20, and named it North Devon, after Devon in England, a name which was changed to Devon Island by the end of the 1800s.
In 1850, Edwin De Haven sailed up Wellington Channel and sighted the Grinnell Peninsula.

An outpost was established at Dundas Harbour in 1924, and it was leased to Hudson's Bay Company nine years later. The collapse of fur prices led to the dispersal of 52 Baffin Island Inuit families on the island in 1934. It was considered a disaster due to wind conditions and the much colder climate, and the Inuit chose to leave in 1936. Dundas Harbour was populated again in the late 1940s, but it was closed again in 1951. Only the ruins of a few buildings remain today.

Geography

Because of its relatively high elevation and its extreme northern latitude, Devon Island supports only a meagre population of muskox and small birds and mammals; the island does support hypolith communities. Animal life is concentrated in the Truelove Lowland area of the island, which has a favourable microclimate and supports relatively lush Arctic vegetation. With a polar desert ecology, Devon Island receives very little precipitation.

Cape Liddon is an Important Bird Area (IBA) notable for its black guillemot and northern fulmar populations. Cape Vera, another IBA site, is also noted for its northern fulmar population.

Scientific research

Devon Island Research Station
The Devon Island Research Station was established in 1960 and it is maintained by the Arctic Institute of North America. It is located in Truelove Lowland, on the northeast coast of Devon Island.

Flashline Mars
The Flashline Mars Arctic Research Station project entered its third season in 2004. In July 2004, Devon Island became the temporary home for five scientists and two journalists, who were to use the Mars-like environment to simulate living and working on that planet. April 2007 through 21 August 2007 was the longest simulation period and included 20 scientific studies.

The Haughton crater is now considered one of the world's best Mars analog sites. It is the summer home to NASA's complementary scientific program, the Haughton–Mars Project. HMP has conducted geological, hydrological, botanical, and microbiological studies in this harsh environment since 1997. HMP-2008 was the twelfth field season at Devon Island.

In 2007, fossils of the seal ancestor Puijila darwini were found on the island.

On July 16, 2013, the Canadian Space Agency assigned Canadian astronaut Jeremy Hansen to a secondment with the Centre for Planetary Science and Exploration of the University of Western Ontario at Haughton Crater in preparation for a potential future crewed exploration of Mars, the Moon or the asteroids.

See also

 Don G. Despain
 Lauterbornia

Notes

References
 NASA Haughton-Mars project
 URBEX - Abandoned ghost town in the Arctic - 2018

Further reading

 Anderson, David G, and L C Bliss. 1998. "Association of Plant Distribution Patterns and Microenvironments on Patterned Ground in a Polar Desert, Devon Island, N.W.T., Canada". Arctic and Alpine Research. 30, no. 2: 97.
 Bliss, L. C. Truelove Lowland, Devon Island, Canada A High Arctic Ecosystem. Edmonton: University of Alberta Press, 1977. (Publisher description)
 Cockell, Charles S, Pascal Lee, Andrew C Schuerger, Loretta Hidalgo, Jeff A Jones, and M Dale Stokes. 2001. "Microbiology and Vegetation of Micro-Oases and Polar Desert, Haughton Impact Crater, Devon Island, Nunavut, Canada". Arctic, Antarctic, and Alpine Research. 33, no. 3: 306.
 Lamoureux, Scott F, and Robert Gilbert. 2004. "A 750-Yr Record of Autumn Snowfall and Temperature Variability and Winter Storminess Recorded in the Varved Sediments of Bear Lake, Devon Island, Arctic Canada". Quaternary Research. 61, no. 2: 134.
 Paterson, W. S. B. "An Oxygen-Isotope Climate Record from the Devon Island Ice Cap, Arctic Canada". Nature, Vol.266,No.5602. 1977.
 Robertson, Peter, and G. D. Mason. Shatter Cones from Haughton Dome, Devon Island, Canada. 1975.
 Thorsteinsson, R., and Ulrich Mayr. The Sedimentary Rocks of Devon Island, Arctic Archipelago. Ottawa, Canada: Geological Survey of Canada, 1987. 
 Ugolini, Fiorenzo C, Giuseppe Corti, and Giacomo Certini. 2007. "Pedogenesis in the Sorted Patterned Ground of Devon Plateau, Devon Island, Nunavut, Canada". Geoderma. 136, no. 1: 87.

External links

Alpine Hydrometerology Lab, University of Lethbridge
Arctic and Alpine Research Group, University of Alberta
Flashline Mars Arctic Research Station (FMARS), The Mars Society

Islands of Baffin Bay
Islands of the Queen Elizabeth Islands
Uninhabited islands of Qikiqtaaluk Region
Former populated places in the Qikiqtaaluk Region